D. Sivanandhan is the former Police Commissioner of Mumbai, promoted as part of the aftermath of the November 2008 Mumbai attacks. He is  India's one of the most well-known and highly regarded Indian Police Service (IPS) officers. His career spanned multiple high-profile postings over 35 years and he is known for his use of strategy & intelligence to uphold the rule of law.

He served as an active member of the special task force in the National Security Council Secretariat, he helped in restructuring India's internal and external national security provisions.

During his tenure he was involved in crushing a major part of the underworld and helped establishing training centres, schools, canteens, gymnasiums and officers’ club- all with state of the art infrastructure. He was also responsible for providing the youth of the city an online portal for better communication.

Professional Highlights

 Retired as the Director General of Police, Maharashtra state in March 2011.
 Deputy Director of the Intelligence Bureau from 1987 to 1991, he was tasked with protecting the nation against international criminal syndicates and terror groups.
 Joint Director of the Central Bureau of Investigation (CBI) from 2001 to 2004 covering Gujarat, Goa & Maharashtra.
 Six years in the Mumbai Crime Branch as Additional Commissioner of Police (ACP) – Crime, and Joint Commissioner of Police (Joint CP)  – Crime (1993–1995 and 1998–2001). His use of strategy & intelligence to uphold the rule of law resulted in a sharp decline in organised crime in the city.
 During his years in the Mumbai Crime Branch, he is credited with having broken the back of the underworld that was at its peak in Mumbai.
 Served for six years as Commissioner of Police for Nagpur, Thane and Mumbai. Appointed as the State Commissioner for Intelligence, he uncovered numerous international rackets protecting the state against foreign based anti-national elements.
 Deputy Inspector General (DIGP) for Nagpur range, focused on anti-Naxal operations from 1995 to 1998.
 Three years as Deputy Commissioner of Police (DCP), Pune and Superintendent of Police (SP), Satara and Sindudurgh.

Other Achievements

 He helped build city's defences post 26/11 by acquiring state-of-the-art equipment.
 Completely revamped the Thane Police School, creating an opportunity for more children to get access to excellent educational environment.
 He was the brains behind the Thane Police Hospital, which was Inaugurated in 2007 with free access to OPD for Police officers.
 He was also heavily involved in the creation many facilities for Police like Thane Police Training Centre, Police Officers Club, Police Canteen, Renovation of the C.P.'s Office.
 To ensure Police fitness, he introduced special executive checkup scheme for the entire Mumbai Police force, which included facilities like Yoga, 25 Gymnasium, OPD Facility, etc.
 During his tenure, he also introduced a website to connect with the city youth and give them a better platform to contact police.
 Recipient of the President's Distinguished Service Medal, 2000 as well as the Meritorious Service Medal, 1993 and the Internal Security Medal, 1998.

He was also a member of the special task force in the National Security Council Secretariat (Prime Minister's Office) for revamping India's internal and external national security measures.

Currently, he serves as the chairman of a security investigations and assessments company called Securus First India Pvt. Ltd. Very many safe city projects have been done successfully by him like Nanded, Aurangabad, Kolhapur. He also serves as a Director for many boards of corporate companies.

He has also co-authored a National best seller titled "Chanakya"s seven secrets of leadership" which is translated into five national languages and 80,000 copies being sold.

Incidents

Sivanandan was appointed Joint Commissioner (Crime) for Mumbai in the mid-1990s to tackle the growing gang wars in the city. During his tenure the city witnessed 238 "encounters" with gangsters.

He is of the 1976 intake.

In Popular Culture
The character of the senior IPS officer portrayed by Malayalam actor and filmmaker Mohanlal in the 2002 film Company is closely based on him.

References

 Video: History Channel documentary on organized crime in India

Indian police chiefs
Living people
Police Commissioners of Mumbai
Year of birth missing (living people)